Major Archibald John Arthur Wavell, 2nd Earl Wavell, MC (11 May 1916 – 24 December 1953) was a British Army officer and peer. He was educated at Winchester College and succeeded his father as Earl Wavell and Viscount Keren of Eritrea in 1950. Wavell was killed in the Mau Mau Uprising, and the titles became extinct on his death.

Military career
Commissioned a second lieutenant in the Black Watch on 30 January 1936, Wavell's first posting was in the British Mandate for Palestine from 1936 to 1939. Promoted to lieutenant on 30 January 1939, he then fought in the Second World War. He lost his left hand fighting the Japanese in Burma in June 1944 in Operation Thursday where he fought with the Chindits. Evacuated to India he served on his father's staff, his father Archibald Wavell, 1st Earl Wavell being the then Viceroy of India.
 
Wavell was promoted to captain on 28 January 1944, and awarded the Military Cross (MC) on 23 January 1947.

Wavell was promoted to major on 30 January 1949, and succeeded to the Wavell earldom on the death of his father on 24 May 1950.

Death
On 23 December 1953, Major Wavell led a patrol of the Black Watch and Kenyan police in pursuit of a sixty-strong Mau Mau gang that had beheaded a loyal Kikuyu tribesman and then fled. Twenty of them were surrounded in a copse at Thika, 25 miles north of Nairobi. Wavell was shot and killed in the first contact of a 10-hour battle.

Earl Wavell is buried in the City Park Cemetery, Nairobi, Block 12, grave 10. His headstone is inscribed with the epitaph: "He found the poetry of Man's endeavour". He is also commemorated by an inscription in the War Cloister at Winchester College, next to the School Cadet Corps Armoury. The 2nd Earl Wavell died unmarried and without issue. The earldom and the viscounty therefore became extinct on his death.

References

1916 births
1953 deaths
Burials in Kenya
Black Watch officers
British military personnel killed in action
British military personnel of the 1936–1939 Arab revolt in Palestine
British military personnel of the Mau Mau Uprising
British Army personnel of World War II
Earls in the Peerage of the United Kingdom
People educated at Winchester College
Recipients of the Military Cross
English amputees